Phellamurin, a flavonoid, is the 7-O-β-D-glucopyranoside, 8-C-prenyl derivative of the flavan-on-ol Aromadendrin, and may be seen as the 7-O-glucoside of noricaritin. Being a flavanonol, it has two stereocenters on the C-ring, so four stereoisomers of phellamurin are possible.

It can be found in Commiphora africana and in Phellodendron amurense.

Related compounds 
6"′-O-acetyl phellamurin is found in the leaves of Phellodendron japonicum.

References

External links

Flavanonol glucosides
Prenylflavonoids